Ken Kifer (October 23, 1945 – September 14, 2003) was an American writer, bicyclist and webmaster. Kifer was a Walden scholar and admirer of Henry David Thoreau, and wrote Analysis and Notes on Walden. His website is still a source of information on bicycling and especially bicycle touring.

Kifer was killed by a drunk driver in September 2003 while riding his bicycle  from his home near Scottsboro, Alabama, USA.

Biography
Kifer was born in Pittsburgh to Paul and Dorothy Kifer and moved to Gadsden, Alabama in 1954.  He attended Jacksonville State University and was a fan of caving.
A keen cyclist, Kifer went on many long and short tours many of which he chronicled on his website, and several that he did not, including one to the west coast of the United States that took him through Montana.

References

External links
 A Forgotten Hero, an article about cyclist Major Taylor by Kifer.
 Article on Kifer from Adventure Cycling.
 Bicycling Advocacy discussion group started by Kifer.
 Why promote cycling?, Ken Kifer, Letters, The BMJ, 2000 Aug 5; 321(7257): 386.

1945 births
2003 deaths
American male cyclists
Male touring cyclists
Road incident deaths in Alabama
Cycling road incident deaths
Writers from Pittsburgh
University of Alabama alumni
Cycling writers
Cyclists from Pennsylvania